Citadel Peak is a peak of volcanic rock along the south side of Vaughan Glacier, approximately 9.6 km east of Mount Vaughan, in the Queen Maud Mountains. Mapped by the U.S. Geological Survey (USGS) from surveys and U.S. Navy air photos, 1960–64. Its name was picked by the New Zealand Geological Survey Antarctic Expedition (NZGSAE), 1969–70; since the summit is composed of vertical rock slabs, its strange appearance being reminiscent of a castle or citadel.

References

External links 

 

Queen Maud Mountains
Mountains of the Ross Dependency